Charles Christopher Pepys, 1st Earl of Cottenham,  (29 April 178129 April 1851) was an English lawyer, judge and politician. He was twice Lord High Chancellor of Great Britain.

Background and education
Cottenham was born in London, the second son of Sir William Pepys, 1st Baronet, a master in chancery, who was descended from John Pepys, of Cottenham, Cambridgeshire, a great-uncle of Samuel Pepys the diarist. Educated at Harrow School and Trinity College, Cambridge, Pepys was called to the bar of Lincoln's Inn in 1804.

Legal and political career
Cottenham's progress was slow practising at the Chancery Bar. Not until 22 years after his call was he made a King's Counsel. He sat in Parliament successively for Higham Ferrers and Malton, became Solicitor General in 1834 and Master of the Rolls in the same year.

On the formation of Lord Melbourne's second administration in April 1835, the great seal was in commission for a time, but Cottenham, who had been a commissioner, was eventually appointed Lord Chancellor in January 1836 and at the same time was raised to the peerage as Baron Cottenham of Cottenham in the County of Cambridge. He held office until the ministry's defeat in August 1841.

Earldom
In February 1841, during the trial of Lord Cardigan for attempted murder, Cottenham claimed ill health, leaving the task of presiding as Lord High Steward to the Lord Chief Justice of the Queen's Bench, Lord Denman. In 1846 he again became Lord Chancellor in Lord John Russell's administration. His health, however, was failing and he resigned in 1850.

Shortly before retirement, he was created Viscount Crowhurst, of Crowhurst in the County of Surrey, and Earl of Cottenham, of Cottenham in the County of Cambridge. He lived at Prospect Place, Wimbledon in 1831–1851. He had succeeded his elder brother as third Baronet in 1845, and in 1849 his cousin as fourth Baronet of Juniper Hill.

Family
Lord Cottenham married Caroline Elizabeth, daughter of William Wingfield-Baker, in 1821 and had five sons and three daughters. He died at Pietra Santa, Lucca in the Italian Grand Duchy of Tuscany in April 1851, aged 70, and was succeeded by his eldest son, Charles, who was at the time Clerk of the Crown in Chancery. Lady Cottenham died in April 1868, aged 66 at The Cedars in Sunninghill, Berkshire.

Cottenham's niece Emily Pepys (1833–1887), daughter of Henry Pepys, Bishop of Worcester, was a child diarist. Her work was not rediscovered and published until 1984.

References

External links

Lord chancellors of Great Britain
Members of the Parliament of the United Kingdom for English constituencies
UK MPs 1831–1832
UK MPs 1832–1835
UK MPs 1835–1837
English King's Counsel
Members of the Privy Council of the United Kingdom
Earls in the Peerage of the United Kingdom
1781 births
1851 deaths
Solicitors General for England and Wales
Masters of the Rolls
Alumni of Trinity College, Cambridge
Younger sons of baronets
People from Cottenham
Pepys family
19th-century English lawyers
Peers of the United Kingdom created by William IV
Peers of the United Kingdom created by Queen Victoria
People educated at Harrow School